The 1981 Atlanta Braves season was the 16th in Atlanta and the 111th overall.

Offseason 
 November 15, 1980: Claudell Washington was signed as a free agent by the Braves.
 December 12, 1980: Doyle Alexander was traded by the Braves to the San Francisco Giants for John Montefusco and Craig Landis (minors).
 January 12, 1981: Gaylord Perry was signed as a free agent by the Braves.
 March 25, 1981: Gary Matthews was traded by the Braves to the Philadelphia Phillies for Bob Walk.<ref> at Baseball Reference'</ref>

 Regular season 

 Season standings 

 Record vs. opponents 

 Roster 

 Player stats 

 Batting 

 Starters by position Note: Pos = Position; G = Games played; AB = At bats; H = Hits; Avg. = Batting average; HR = Home runs; RBI = Runs batted in Other batters Note: G = Games played; AB = At bats; H = Hits; Avg. = Batting average; HR = Home runs; RBI = Runs batted in Pitching 

 Starting pitchers Note: G = Games pitched; IP = Innings pitched; W = Wins; L = Losses; ERA = Earned run average; SO = Strikeouts Other pitchers Note: G = Games pitched; IP = Innings pitched; W = Wins; L = Losses; ERA = Earned run average; SO = Strikeouts Relief pitchers Note: G = Games pitched; W = Wins; L = Losses; SV = Saves; ERA = Earned run average; SO = Strikeouts Farm system 

 Notes 

 References 

1981 Atlanta Braves season at Baseball Reference''

Atlanta Braves seasons
Atlanta Braves Season, 1981
Atlanta